Mid-term parliamentary elections were held in Costa Rica on 11 February 1934. The result was a victory for the Independent National Republican Party, which received 48.1% of the vote. Voter turnout was 41.6%.

Results

References

1934 elections in Central America
1934 in Costa Rica
Elections in Costa Rica